Chris Guccione and Rajeev Ram were the defending champions but chose not to defend their title.

Marc Polmans and Matt Reid won the title after defeating Benjamin Bonzi and Antoine Hoang 6–4, 4–6, [10–8] in the final.

Seeds

Draw

References

External links
 Main draw

Nottingham Trophy - Men's Doubles